Franklin is a masculine English given name. It is of English coming from the medieval English Frankeleyn, coming from the Anglo-Norman fraunclein. Its meaning is landowner of free but not noble origin.

People with the given name
 Franklin Bache (1792–1864), American physician, chemist, professor and writer
 Franklin Archibald Dick (1823–1885), American lawyer
 Franklin Chang-Díaz (born 1950), mechanical engineer and physicist, former NASA astronaut
 Franklin Hughes Delano (1813–1893), American merchant, diplomat and society man.
 Franklin Drilon (born 1945), Filipino politician
 Franklin Engelmann (1908–1972), British radio personality
 Franklin Florence (1934–2023), American civil rights activist
 Franklin Delano Floyd (1943–2023), American murderer
 Franklin Graham (born 1952), son of Billy Graham
 Franklin J. Knoll (born 1940), American politician, lawyer, and judge
 Franklin P. Peterson (1930–2000), American mathematician specializing in algebraic topology
 Franklin Pierce (1804–1869), 14th President of the United States of America
 Franklin Pierce Jr. (1836–1836), infant son of Franklin Pierce
 Franklin "Frank" Robert Pierce (1839–1843), son of Franklin Pierce
 Franklin D. Roosevelt (1882–1945), 32nd President of the United States of America
 Franklin D. Roosevelt Jr. (1914–1988), American lawyer, businessman, and politician
 Franklin D. Roosevelt III (born 1938), American educator
 Franklin Rosborough "Frank" Thomas (1912–2004), American animator and pianist
 Franklin Delano Williams (1947–1993), American singer

Fictional characters
Franklin (Peanuts), a character in the Peanuts comic strip
Franklin Bordeau, a member of the phantom troupe from the manga Hunter x Hunter
Franklin Clarke, fictional murderer in Agatha Christie's The A.B.C. Murders
Franklin Clinton, a playable character in the video game Grand Theft Auto V
Franklin Nelson, known as Foggy Nelson, a character from the Daredevil comic
Franklin Rock, a character from the DC comics, also known as Sgt. Rock
Franklin the Turtle, the protagonist of the eponymous series of Canadian children's books and two television adaptations
Freewheelin' Franklin Freek, one of the Fabulous Furry Freak Brothers.
Franklin Delano Bluth, a puppet on Arrested Development, who is voiced by G.O.B., and whose portrayal featuring stereotypical Black traits is deeply racist.

Related names
Frank (given name), a short name for Franklin
Franklin (surname)

See also
 

English masculine given names